The Western District is one of the primary divisions of American Samoa. It consists of the western portion of Tutuila Island. It has a land area of 74.781 km2 (28.873 sq mi) and contains 29 villages plus a part of Nu'uuli village. Among these is the largest village of American Samoa, Tafuna, at its eastern end. The district's total population as of the 2010 census was 31,329.

Dental and medical care to residents of the Western District are offered by Tafuna Community Health Center.

District divisions
Lealataua County
Leasina County
Tualatai County
Tualauta County

Demographics

Western District of Tutuila was first recorded beginning with the 1900 U.S. Census. No census was taken in 1910, but a special census was taken in 1912. Regular decennial censuses were taken beginning in 1920.

See also
Eastern District, American Samoa
Manu'a District, American Samoa

References

 American Samoa, its districts and unorganized islands; United States Census Bureau

Districts of American Samoa
Tutuila